Highland House can refer to:
The former name of North Tower (Salford), a highrise building in Salford, Greater Manchester, England
 Highland House (Truro, Massachusetts), an historic house in Truro, Massachusetts